Namatanai Rural LLG is a local government area in New Ireland Province, Papua New Guinea. The LLG is located in Namatanai District and the LLG headquarters is Namatanai. 

The LLG is accessible by road from Kavieng and is bordered by Sentral Niu Ailan Rural LLG in the north, Matalai Rural LLG in the south east and Konoagil Rural LLG in the west coast. The local language is Patpatar language with its Pala, Hinsaal, Sokarek and Sokirik dialects while the Niwer Mil language is spoken by Tanga Islanders who have bought blocks of land at Bo village.

The LLG president is Michael Singan. Current Population is 20,003 as per 2011 PNG National Census Report.

Wards
01. Palabong
02. Kabanut (including Umudu village)
03. Matakan
04. Burau
05. Rasirik
06. Labur
07. Loloba
08. Kanapit
09. Pire
10. Namatanai
12. Salimun
13. Bisapu
14. Sopau
15. Rativis
16. Hipaling
17. Himau
18. Nokon
19. Hipakat
20. Kembeng
21. Sena
81. Namatanai Urban

References

 Patpatar at Ethnologue (18th ed., 2015)

Local-level governments of New Ireland Province